A dismounting stele is a stone tablet or stele traditionally erected outside important buildings or building complexes in Chinese and East Asian architecture. It gives notice of the nearest point to the location that riders should dismount horses or exit vehicles for properly respectful approach.

Locations
Dismounting steles were placed in front of gates to important buildings or institutions such as imperial tombs, palaces, the Imperial City and major temples and shrines, especially Confucian temples. They could be placed singularly or in pairs on opposite sides of the path. Whether such steles are placed in front of a particular building was dictated by rules of protocol. In imperial times, this was generally controlled by the Ministry of Rites. The Emperor sometimes granted the placement of a dismounting stele as a sign of favor towards an institution, group or person.

References

Architecture in China
Traditional East Asian Architecture